The Olomane River is a river in the Côte-Nord region of Quebec, Canada.

Location

It lies between the basins of the Washicoutai River to the west and the Coacoachou River to the east.
It includes part of the unorganized territory of Petit-Mécatina, Quebec and part of the municipality of Côte-Nord-du-Golfe-du-Saint-Laurent.
The proposed River Natashquan Biodiversity Reserve would be partially within the watershed.

It rises in a swampy area, first flows northwest, then makes an abrupt turn and flows south to the Gulf of Saint Lawrence.
The mouth of the Olomane River is in the municipality of Côte-Nord-du-Golfe-du-Saint-Laurent in Le Golfe-du-Saint-Laurent Regional County Municipality.
The Innu settlement of La Romaine is on the west shore of the bay at the mouth of the river.

Description
According to the Dictionnaire des rivières et lacs de la province de Québec (1914),

Name

Eugène Rouillard (1906) says the Innu language word Olomanoshibo means "Paint River" and refers to the reddish color of the water.
Red ocher deposits are found on the banks of the river.
The river is named Ouraman in the 1685 map by Jean-Baptiste-Louis Franquelin.
Variants of the name since the 18th century include Eau ramane (Jacques-Nicolas Bellin 1744), Oraman, Ouramane, Oraman, Olomanosheebo and Olomanasheebou. 
The Olomane form was adopted in 1921.
In the Dictionnaire des rivières et lacs de la province de Québec (1925) the river was named Grande Romaine to distinguish it from the Romaine River that enters the Gulf of Saint Lawrence  to the west at Havre-Saint-Pierre.

Settlement

The Innu people have traditionally left their winter hunting grounds and lived at the mouth of the river in summer.
A trading post operated at the mouth of the river from 1710 to 1925.
A report dated 11 May 2009 said that the community of La Romaine did not support a project to connect the settlement to the main network from Natashquan, and a partnership for a 6.6 MW hydroelectric plant on the Olomane River, located near the village, was being explored.
The existing 4 MW diesel plant was expected to no longer be sufficient by 2015.

Notes

Sources

Rivers of Côte-Nord